This is list of women's Austrian association footballers who have played for the Austria women's national football team since the first match in 1990.

Players 
As of 31 October 2013 after the match against France

See also 
 Austria women's national football team
 List of Austria international footballers

References

 
Austria
International footballers
International footballers
Football in Austria
Association football player non-biographical articles